The Wild Parrots of Telegraph Hill is a 2003 documentary film directed, produced, and edited by Judy Irving. It chronicles the relationship between Mark Bittner, an unemployed musician who lives rent-free in a cabin in the Telegraph Hill-neighborhood of San Francisco, and a flock of feral parrots that he feeds and looks after. Bittner also wrote a memoir about his experiences with the parrots, which shares the title of the documentary, but has the added subtitle: A Love Story...with Wings.

In May 2007, the documentary aired on the PBS series Independent Lens.

Summary
Much of the film focuses on the parrots and their individual personalities and relationships with one another and Bittner. The flock is composed primarily of cherry-headed conures, but there is one lonely blue-crowned conure. Some San Francisco residents share the different stories they have heard about the possible origins of the flock.

Bittner tells his story as well. He had come down to San Francisco from Seattle to be a musician, but, after giving up on that dream, found himself directionless. Although he would occasionally do odd jobs, he mostly was more or less unemployed and homeless for many years, until he found some stability, thanks to a free place to stay, and purpose (and even minor celebrity), thanks to the relationship he developed with the parrots.

The later part of the film depicts Bittner's preparations to vacate his residence, which is about to undergo extensive renovations. He speaks to the city council about the parrots and finds a place to send the few birds that are unable to live with the flock, and so had been living with him. At the end, it is revealed that filmmaker, Judy Irving, and subject, Mark Bittner, began a relationship over the course of making the film.

Aftermath
As is explained in the special features included on the DVD release of the film, about a year after Bittner left Telegraph Hill, he and Irving moved back, to a house near his old one, and he reestablished his connection with the flock of parrots, which had grown some. Bittner and Irving were later married. In 2007 the city of San Francisco instituted a ban on feeding the flock. The ban was supported by Bittner.

Production
Raising funding for the film was difficult at first, as Irving had to find individual donors, but the proceeds from a fundraiser at which Bittner gave a presentation to a packed theater allowed her to start shooting the film in earnest.

The musical score for the film was the final project by Chris Michie, a Bay area musician who was formerly the guitarist for Van Morrison, before his death from melanoma. The film, which Michie did not live to see released, is dedicated to him.

Bittner noted that there is humor in the piece, which he believes makes it different from many other nature documentaries.

Awards
The film won the Genesis Award for Documentary Film and was nominated for the 2005 Satellite Award for Outstanding Documentary DVD.

References

External links

 The Wild Parrots of Telegraph Hill site for Independent Lens on PBS
 
 
 

2003 films
2003 documentary films
Documentary films about San Francisco
Documentary films about birds
Documentary films about urban animals
Parrots
Feral parrots
Environment of the San Francisco Bay Area
Films shot in San Francisco
Films set in San Francisco
2000s English-language films
English-language documentary films